The Hands is a 2006 Argentinean-Italian film directed by Alejandro Doria. The plot was inspired by the life and work of Catholic priest Mario Pantaleo. Doria and Juan Bautista Stagnaro wrote the screenplay. The film won one Goya Award.

Cast
 Graciela Borges as Perla
 Jorge Marrale as Padre Mario Pantaleo
 Duilio Marzio as Monseñor Alessandri
 Esteban Pérez as Javier
 Belén Blanco as Silvia
 Carlos Portaluppi as Padre Giacomino
 Carlos Weber as Monseñor Arizaga
 Jean Pierre Reguerraz as Spagnuolo
 María Socas
 Juan Carlos Gené
 Liana Lombard

Movie Awards and nominations
Argentine Film Critics Association Awards
Won: Best Costume Design
Nominated: Best Actor – Leading Role (Jorge Marrale)
Nominated: Best Actor – Supporting Role (Duilio Marzio)
Nominated: Best Actress – Leading Role (Graciela Borges)
Nominated: Best Art Direction (Margarita Jusid)
Nominated: Best Director (Alejandro Doria)
Nominated: Best Film
Nominated: Best New Actor (Esteban Perez)
Nominated: Best Screenplay – Original (Alejandro Doria and Juan Bautista Stagnaro)

Goya Awards (Spain)
Won: Best Spanish Language Foreign Film

External links

2006 films
2000s Spanish-language films
Argentine drama films
Films directed by Alejandro Doria
Films scored by Federico Jusid
2000s Argentine films